Thomas Ram (1564 – 1634) was an Anglican priest in the early seventeenth century.

Born at Windsor, he was educated at Eton and King's College, Cambridge. He was appointed Chaplain to Robert Devereux, 2nd Earl of Essex the Lord Lieutenant of Ireland in 1599; Vicar choral of Christ Church Cathedral, Dublin in 1600; Dean of Cork in 1601; Dean of Ferns in 1604; and  Bishop of Ferns and Leighlin in 1605.

He died in Dublin on 24 November 1634.

References

17th-century Anglican bishops in Ireland
Deans of Cork
Deans of Ferns
Bishops of Ferns and Leighlin
1564 births
1634 deaths
Alumni of King's College, Cambridge
People educated at Eton College
People from Windsor, Berkshire